Marilyn Joi (born May 22, 1945) is an American actress who appeared in a number of exploitation films during the 1970s.

Career 
Joi starred in several films by Al Adamson including The Naughty Stewardesses (1974), Blazing Stewardesses (1975) and Black Samurai (1977), and played the henchwoman Velvet in Ilsa, Harem Keeper of the Oil Sheiks (1976), and Cleopatra Schwartz in The Kentucky Fried Movie (1977). Among her other film credits were roles in Hit Man (1972), Mean Mother (1974), The Candy Tangerine Man (1975), Mansion of the Doomed (1976), The Happy Hooker Goes to Washington (1977), Nurse Sherri (1978) and Galaxina (1980).

She was often credited as Tracy King, Tracy Ann King and T.A. King.

Filmography

Film

Television

References

External links

1945 births
Living people
African-American actresses
American film actresses
Actresses from New Orleans
21st-century African-American people
21st-century African-American women
20th-century African-American people
20th-century African-American women